Games for Good (GfG) is a non-profit charitable organization which raises funds and products from within the entertainment industry and donates them to child-centric partners. Started in 1998 by a group of volunteers, GfG was led by industry veteran Lynne Killey. It raises money and requests that game publishers donate video and computer games to them for re-distribution to children's charities. It hosts dinners, silent auctions and parties.

Within a few years, the small undertaking had grown too large for a volunteer staff to handle and the effort was left dormant. In the following years, several other game industry charities took up the effort of supporting individual children's charities in meaningful and productive ways, but none utilizing the repository model of supporting other charities.

The Interactive Entertainment Merchants Association (IEMA), the U.S. trade association which represents the game industry's leading retailers, began receiving in three finished copies of each and every computer game manufactured due to a royalty-free licensing agreement that the association has with publishers. That agreement standardized the PC game box,  reducing it from the oversized software standard, down to the current double-thick DVD size, and also standardized the PC CD and PC DVD icons (the small black and white logos that indicate the platform the game is created for). The IEMA has been donating the games to children's hospitals and local area charities and schools when long-time friends Lynne Killey (the founder of GfG) and Hal Halpin (the president of the IEMA) decided to restart the organizations.

Now re-launched, Games for Good is being run by the IEMA's staff. In addition to asking game publishers and developers to provide the three finished copies of each PC game they make, GfG is also asking for them to commit to providing three finished copies of all games they create on all platforms and to help them with sponsorship funds.

References

External links 

 

Video game organizations
Children's charities based in the United States
Information technology charities
Organizations established in 1998